Public housing is a form of housing tenure in which the property is usually owned by a government authority, either central or local. Although the common goal of public housing is to provide affordable housing, the details, terminology, definitions of poverty, and other criteria for allocation vary within different contexts. 

In the United States, public housing developments are classified either as housing projects that are owned by a city's Housing authority or federally subsidized public housing operated through HUD.

Social housing is any rental housing that may be owned and managed by the state, by non-profit organizations, or by a combination of the two, usually with the aim of providing affordable housing. Social housing is generally rationed by a government through some form of means-testing or through administrative measures of housing need. One can regard social housing as a potential remedy for housing inequality. 

Affordable housing goals can also be achieved through subsidies. Subsidized housing is owned and operated by private owners who receive subsidies in exchange for providing affordable housing. Owners may be individual landlords or for-profit or nonprofit corporations.

History 

Social housing had existed sporadically prior to modern developments. The oldest still in use is the 16th-century Fuggerei in Augsburg, Bavaria.

The origins of modern municipal housing lie in the dramatic urban population increase caused by the Industrial Revolution of the 19th century. In the large cities of the period, many social commentators, such as Octavia Hill and Charles Booth reported on the squalor, sickness and immorality that arose. Henry Mayhew, visiting Bethnal Green, wrote in The Morning Chronicle:

Some philanthropists began to provide housing in tenement blocks, and some factory owners built entire villages for their workers, such as Saltaire in 1853 and Port Sunlight in 1888. It was in 1885, after the report from a Royal Commission in England, that the state first took an interest. This led to the Housing of the Working Classes Act of 1885, which empowered Local Government Boards to shut down unhealthy properties and encouraged them to improve the housing in their areas.

The City of London Corporation built tenements in the Farringdon Road in 1865. The world's first large-scale housing project was built in London to replace one of the capital's most notorious slums – the Old Nichol. Nearly 6,000 individuals were crammed into the packed streets, where one child in four died before his or her first birthday. Arthur Morrison wrote the influential A Child of the Jago, an account of the life of a child in the slum, which sparked a public outcry. Construction of the Boundary Estate was begun in 1890 by the Metropolitan Board of Works and completed by the then-recently formed London County Council in 1900.

The success of this project spurred many local councils to embark on similar construction schemes in the early 20th century. The Arts and Crafts movement and Ebenezer Howard's garden city ideas led to the leafy London County Council cottage estates such as firstly Totterdown Fields and later Wormholt and Old Oak. The First World War indirectly provided a new impetus, when the poor physical health and condition of many urban recruits to the British Army was noted with alarm. In 1916, 41% of conscripts were unfit to serve. This led to a campaign known as Homes fit for heroes and in 1919 the Government first compelled councils to provide housing, helping them to do so through the provision of subsidies, under the Housing Act 1919. Public housing projects were tried out in some European countries and the United States in the 1930s, but only became widespread globally after the Second World War.

Africa

South Africa 
South African apartheid featured high poverty rates in Black South Africans due to racial segregation and discrimination, so the post-apartheid government has sought to build social housing for poor black households, in urban areas with economic opportunity.  The Reconstruction and Development and Breaking New Ground programs have provided over 3.5 million houses from 1995 to 2020, but they did not fully meet demand, and were built away from inner urban areas, exacerbating racial divides. The housing shortage was estimated to be 3.7 million units in 2021. The Department of Human Settlements, which facilitates national housing development, has sought to transition from a housing-focused development model to a holistic view, including services.

Americas

Brazil 

 ("My House, My Life"), the Brazilian federal government's social housing program, was launched in March 2009 with a budget of R$36 billion (US$18 billion) to build one million homes. The second stage of the program, included within the government Growth Acceleration Program (PAC) was announced in March 2010. This stage foresaw the construction of a further two million homes.

All funds for  properties were provided by the Brazilian public bank, . The bank financed development and provided mortgages for qualifying families.

, 4.5 million homes were built and distributed to the population. The project has been criticized for its placement and quality of the houses. Houses are built far from the city centre to reduce housing costs which consequently reduces access to the labor market; a study of randomly selected houses of the MCMV project in Rio de Janeiro showed a reduced likelihood of being formally employed in job-seekers but income was not affected in those who were already employed.

Canada 

In Canada, public housing is usually a block of purpose-built subsidized housing operated by a government agency, often simply referred to as community housing, with easier-to-manage townhouses. Many cities in Canada still maintain large high-rise clustered developments in working-class neighborhoods, a system that has fallen into disfavour in both the United States and the United Kingdom. However, many public housing corporations still offer a variety of buildings and communities ranging from individual houses to townhouse communities and mid-rise and high-rise apartments in both working-class and middle-class neighborhoods that house a significant number of low-income Canadians.

Following the decentralisation of public housing to local municipalities, Social Housing Services Corporation (SHSC) was created in the Province of Ontario in 2002 to provide group services for social housing providers (public housing, non-profit housing and co-operative housing). It is a non-profit corporation which provides Ontario housing providers and service managers with bulk purchasing, insurance, investment and information services that add significant value to their operations.

Recently, there has been a move toward the integration of public housing with market housing and other uses. Revitalization plans for properties such as in the notorious Downtown Eastside of Vancouver, Regent Park, in Toronto, and Rochester Heights in Ottawa, aim to provide better accommodations for low-income residents, and connect them to the greater community. The aim of the reconstruction plans are often to better integrate it into the traditional grid of streets, improve leisure and cultural amenities. However, the residents of these communities often have had little effective input in the plans and have had mixed reactions to the construction.

In 2014, Vancouver, long considered one of the least affordable cities in the world, changed the definition of social housing to mean rental housing in which a minimum of 30 percent of dwelling units are occupied by households that cannot pay market rents, due to lack of income.

Mexico 

At the end of the Second World War, enriched by US investments and an oil boom, Mexico had its first demographic boom, in which the primary destination for rural immigrants was Mexico City. , a famous architect at time, was charged to build its first large-scale public housing project.

His later project, the   built in 1960–65, was meant to develop one of the poorest parts of the city, which was becoming a slum.

Today most of the  has been demolished.

Mexico has had experience with housing projects since 's regime (1877–1880, 1884–1911).

Puerto Rico 

An  is a type of housing where land is developed into lots, often by a private developer, and where single-family homes are built. More recently, non-single-family units, such as condominiums and townhouses are being built which also fall into this category. (In Puerto Rico, a condominium is a housing unit located in a high-rise building. Public housing, on the other hand, are housing units built with government funding, primarily through programs of the US Department of Housing and Urban Development (HUD) and the US Department of Agriculture (USDA).

Increasingly, however, public housing developments are being built that consist of other than the traditional multi-family dwellings with all exterior grounds consisting of shared outside area, for example, public housing may consist of single family garden apartments units. In this sense,  as well as public housing developments (as well as one or several  in the popular sense) may be located in one of these 901 official geographic areas.

United States 

In the nineteenth and early twentieth centuries, government involvement in housing for the poor was chiefly in the introduction of building standards. Atlanta, Georgia's Techwood Homes, dedicated in 1935, were the nation's first public housing project. Most housing communities were developed from the 1930s onward and initial public housing was largely slum clearance, with the requirement insisted upon by private builders that for every unit of public housing constructed, a unit of private housing would be demolished.

This also eased concerns of the establishment by eliminating or altering neighborhoods commonly considered a source of disease, and reflected progressive-era sanitation initiatives. Moreover, public housing, along with the Federal Highway Program, demolished the older, substandard housing of communities of color across the United States.

However, the advent of makeshift tent communities during the Great Depression caused concern in the Administration. The Federal public housing program was created by the 1937 Act, in which operations were "sustained primarily by tenant rents." As a result, public housing in its earliest decades was usually much more working-class and middle-class and white than it was by the 1970s. Many Americans associate large, multi-story towers with public housing, but early projects were actually low-rise, though Le Corbusier superblocks caught on before World War II.

A unique US public housing initiative was the development of subsidized middle-class housing during the late New Deal (1940–42) under the auspices of the Mutual Ownership Defense Housing Division of the Federal Works Agency under the direction of Colonel Lawrence Westbrook. These eight projects were purchased by the residents after the Second World War and as of 2009 seven of the projects continue to operate as mutual housing corporations owned by their residents. These projects are among the very few definitive success stories in the history of the US public housing effort.

Public housing was only built with the blessing of the local government, and projects were almost never built on suburban greenfields, but through regeneration of older neighborhoods. The destruction of tenements and eviction of their low-income residents consistently created problems in nearby neighborhoods with "soft" real estate markets. Houses, apartments or other residential units are usually subsidized on a rent-geared-to-income (RGI) basis. Some communities have now embraced a mixed income, with both assisted and market rents, when allocating homes as they become available.

A significant change in the program took place in 1969, with the passage of the Brooke Amendment.  Rents now became set at 25% of a tenant's income with the result that the program began serving the "poorest tenants."

The federal Housing and Urban Development (HUD) department's 1993 HOPE VI program addressed concerns of distressed properties and blighted superblocks with revitalization and funding projects for the renewal of public housing to decrease its density and allow for tenants with mixed income levels. Projects continue to have a reputation for violence, drug use, and prostitution, especially in New Orleans, Washington, D.C. 
Chicago and Detroit, leading to the passage of a 1996 federal "one strike you're out" law, enabling the eviction of tenants convicted of crimes, especially drug-related, or merely as a result of being tried for some crimes.

Other attempts to solve these problems include the 1974 Section 8 Housing Program, which encourages the private sector to construct affordable homes, and subsidized public housing.  This assistance can be "project-based", subsidizing properties, or "tenant-based", which provides tenants with a voucher, accepted by some landlords.

Asia

China 

The public-owned housing system was established when the Chinese Communist Party started a planned economy in the 1950s as part of its Great Leap Forward. The system was funded by the central government's budget and were administered and distributed by state-owned enterprises. The occupants of the public housing were usually the employees of the enterprises and their family, who were subject to pay rent at a very low price. The size and the type of room the households received were dependent on their job title or administrative level. The central government found it difficult to upkeep the public housing due to the low rent it received; the distribution policy that was intended to be "equalitarianism" was actually corrupt.

The Chinese government commercialized the housing market after the economic reform started in 1978 by Deng Xiaoping. The public houses that were constructed before that the economic reforms were categorized as "Old Public Houses". "Old Public Houses" were, in principle, not supposed to be privately sold, but the household could sell it after purchasing the ownership of the building (not the property), and such transactions were subject to be review by local housing authorities and the State-owned Assets Supervision and Administration Commission. However, an informal filing system and unclear policies resulted in problems of corruption and family dispute.

The concept of the low-cost rental housing can be traced to a 1998 policy statement, but did not truly take off until 2006 due to limited funding and administrative problems. The provision of more affordable housing is one of the key components of China's Twelfth Five-year Plan, which targets the construction of 36 million homes by 2015. That program's costs will be split between the private and public sector and are estimated at five trillion yuan by China International Capital Corporation.

Hong Kong 
 	

In Hong Kong, public housing is one of the major housing policies of the government. Nearly half of Hong Kong's 7.5 million population lives in public housing. The two main public housing providers are the Housing Authority and the Housing Society.

The most common types of public housing in Hong Kong are public rental housing (PRH) and subsidised sale flats produced under the Home Ownership Scheme (HOS). In 2016, approximately 31 per cent of Hong Kong households lived in PRH flats while 15 per cent resided in subsidised sale flats (of all types).

The origin of large-scale public housing in Hong Kong can be traced to the resettlement programme launched by the Hong Kong government in the 1950s in response to the increasing prevalence of squatter settlements, which emerged as a result of a great influx of refugees following the Communist revolution in China. The squatter villages were considered unsafe as they were susceptible to disastrous fires, including a 1953 blaze in Shek Kip Mei that rendered over 50,000 people homeless overnight.

Large-scale resettlement estates were built throughout the 1950s and 1960s. In 1973, the government of Sir Murray MacLehose launched the Ten-Year Housing Programme, which aimed to provide the entire population with "satisfactory housing" within a decade. The government also launched the Home Ownership Scheme (HOS) in 1976 to enable lower-income households to purchase flats.

Many public housing estates were built as part of new town development programmes. During the 1980s, most of the earliest resettlement estates (from the 1950s and early 1960s) were also rebuilt to modern standards. Public housing remains a key concern of the Hong Kong Government, which plans to construct some 330,000 units between 2022 and 2032.

Indonesia
Indonesia has undertaken One Million Houses program for low-income people. The program has been implementing since 2015 to achieve an ambitious target of building 10 million houses. The proportion of the housing is 70 percent for low-income people and 30 percent for non-low-income people. This program is a joint movement between the Central Government, regional governments, real estate developers and the community. The program is targeted to reach one million housing units annually. In 2015, about 700,000 homes were built, increasing to approximately 800,000 in 2016 and around 904,000 by the end of 2017.

Japan 

 is the Japanese word for a large cluster of apartment buildings or houses of a particular style and design, typically built as public housing by government authorities.

The Japan Housing Corporation (JHC), now known as the Urban Renaissance Agency (UR), was founded in 1955. During the 1950s, 1960s, and 1970s, the JHC built many  in suburban areas to offset the increasing housing demand during the post-World War II economic boom. It introduced the Japanese salaryman to a life around the nuclear family in contrast with the multi-generation homes before the war.

Residents in UR danchi do not have to pay key money or contract renewal fees, making the residences cheaper than comparable housing even if the monthly rents are equivalent.

Singapore 

In Singapore, the public housing program, particularly the planning and development of new public housing and the allocation of rental units and resale of existing ownership units, is managed by the Housing and Development Board. Day-to-day management of public housing communities has been delegated to Town Councils headed by the local members of parliament.

In 2018, 78.7% of Singaporeans live in public residential developments, ranging from studio units to executive condominiums provided by the HDB, a major factor in Singapore having one of the highest home-ownership rates – over 90% of the resident population – in the world.

Vietnam 

From the 1960s to the 1980s, Vietnam built Khu tập thể (KTT), socialist-modeled apartment blocks on the periphery of cities for civil servants, state-owned companies' workers, and military personnel. Market reforms in the late 1980s resulted in the partial privatization of the KTT, which were sold to low- and low-middle income populations. The KTT have since become dilapidated, due to a lack of municipal funding for repairs and maintenance, and been the target of demolition, displacement, and redevelopment for high-income populations.	

In the 2010s, Vietnam has experienced a surge in property prices, with the affordable housing stock shrinking by 7% of the entire housing stock from 2014 to 2016, and apartment prices rising by 90% between 2017 and 2020. Developers are not interested in social housing projects since they are not profitable, even amidst rising demand from workers, so the Ministry of Construction requires funding to build 294,600 social housing units in the 2021 – 2025 period.

Europe

European Union 
According to a 2018 discussion paper of the European Commission, in 2015, 11.3% of the EU-population lived in households that spent 40% or more of their disposable income on housing.
In January 2019, the former European Commission President, Romano Prodi, declared that "public investment in social infrastructure during the Eurocrisis reached a 20-year low. Current investment in social infrastructure in the EU is estimated at 170 billion euros per year. The minimum infrastructure investment gap in these sectors is estimated at 100 to 150 billion euros, representing a total gap of at least 1.5 trillion euros between 2018 and 2030."

Housing projects in Europe can be found in urban areas, as well as in suburban areas. 

The EU was moving to support more affordable, energy-efficient and accessible housing with the financial contribution of the CEB and of the EIB through its European Fund for Strategic Investments. Public funding was planned to be directed primarily on affordable housing and secondly in the education and lifelong learning, health and long-term care sectors.

Austria 

Public housing was an important issue right from the foundation of the Republic of German-Austria in 1918. The population was faced with a great deal of uncertainty particularly as regards food and fuel. This led to a significant number of less affluent people to move to the periphery of towns, often building makeshift homes to be closer to where they could grow food. They were called  ('settlers'). As the political situation became stabilised with foundation of the First Austrian Republic in September 1919, the  movement started creating formal organizations like the Austrian Association for Settlements and Small Gardens. The electoral victory of the Social Democratic Party of Austria in the elections for the Viennese  (city parliament) gave rise to Red Vienna. Part of their programme was the provision of decent homes for the Viennese working class who made up the core of their supporters. Hence the German word  for "municipality building". In Austria, it refers to residential buildings erected by a municipality, usually to provide public housing.  These have been an important part of the architecture and culture of Vienna since the 1920s.

Belgium 
Social housing is a responsibility of the regions in Belgium. The regions don't directly own the houses, semi-private social housing corporations do. The government regulates and mostly finances this corporations. Below a certain income limit, people are eligible for social housing. Because there is a major shortage of social housing in Belgium, other priority conditions are often imposed, such as having children to care for. Social housing accounts for approximately 6.5% of the Belgian housing market. This is much lower than neighbouring countries such as the Netherlands and France. As of 2018 Flanders, Wallonia and Brussels are responsible for 280,687 social houses, 212,794 people are on the waiting list. For the people on the waiting list there are other possibilities such as subsidies and sociale rental agencies in Flanders.

Denmark 
In Denmark, public housing is called  and is owned and administered by approximately 700 self-governing, democratic and non-profit organizations by and for the tenants themselves. Many of the public housing organizations in Denmark are rooted in the early history of the labor unions and currently forms about 20% of the total housing stock with about 7,500 departments countrywide. A membership of a housing organization is usually required to obtain a rental and they are granted with regard to length of membership.

Although the buildings are owned and administered by self-governing and economically independent organizations, the State of Denmark is strongly regulating public housing in the country. By law, the municipalities have access to 25% of the rentals, usually reserving them for the poor, the unemployed, the disabled or mentally ill or any other group dependent on social benefits from the municipality. Over the years, these regulations have created many 'vulnerable residential areas' within the country. Danish public housing has never had any income restrictions, but in recent years new state regulations has made it mandatory for several of them to favor fully employed renters and disfavor unemployed or part-time employed people. This is a relatively new effort by the state to counter the ghettoisation, which is now an officially recognized problem countrywide.

As in Sweden, state and municipal policies carried out throughout the first decade of the 21st century, has led to an increased privatization of public housing. In many areas, residents have been offered to buy their own flats, thereby effectively changing the status of the property. The privatization of public housing was initiated as part of an ideological program by the right wing governments of the early 21st century and was launched a few years after the closure of the former Ministry of Housing Affairs in 2001. The former ministry was re-opened as Ministry of Housing, Urban and Rural Affairs in October 2011, when a new coalition government led by social-democrats was formed.

Finland 

The earliest public housing project in Finland was in Helsinki. The residents were mainly working-class families with several children. The apartments had an average of five people per room, sometimes up to eight. The tiny apartments were equipped with running water, a pantry and an attic cupboard. Every apartment had its own toilet in the cellar. Electric lighting was installed in 1918.

The homes and lives of worker families in Helsinki from 1909 to 1985 are presented in a museum near the  amusement park.

In 2008, Helsinki launched its Housing First policy, with the goal of ending homelessness by prioritizing unconditional housing. With municipal, state, and NGO support, and coupled with health and medical services, the program reduced homelessness by 35% between 2008 and 2019.

France 

After World War II, the population increased at a rate previously unknown, the rural exodus increased, while war damage had reduced the number of houses in many cities. Rental prices dramatically rose, and the government made a law in 1948 to block them, effectively ending the economic benefits of housing investment. Rents were gradually deregulated until debate in the 1980s led to the current rental law of 1989 theoretically balancing landlord and tenant relations. However, there was a major homelessness crisis in the winter of 1953–4 and the necessary laws were gradually mobilized producing high levels of construction almost continuously from the 1960s. Social landlords were a major source of expertise as well as construction actors with links to national and local bodies. The construction industry was at the time inadequate so political support was needed.

It is incorrect to refer to French social housing as public housing. The originally socialist idea was promoted by some French employers in the 2nd half of the 19th century. Public housing companies followed before World War I. There are still different social housing movements, public, private and some cooperative. Social landlord organizations all have similar regulation and similar access to government loans but there are significant differences.

The government launched a series of major construction plans, including the creation of new towns and new suburbs with HLM ("low-rent housing"). The state had the funds and the legal means to acquire the land and could provide some advantages to the companies that then built its huge housing complexes of hundreds of apartments. Quality was also effectively regulated, resulting in decent or even top quality housing for the standard of the 1950s and 1960s. The construction of HLMs were subject to much political debate. Much smaller developments are now the norm.

France still retains this system, a recent law making it an obligation for every town to have at least 20% HLM. Nowadays HLM represents roughly half of the rental market (46% in 2006). Social housing is not all for disadvantaged people who are just one of the target groups. Part of the funding can be provided by employer-employee groups to provide housing for local employees. The 20% target can include intermediate housing for better off groups, although its object is to produce social mix. Gentrification and the very basis of social housing allocation are divisive issues as well as the extent of local control of housing. This housing has always been a multi-actor activity and recent local government reorganization continues to change the political landscape.

While they succeeded in giving lower-income families a place to live in the drive to provide popular housing, this system also led to the creation of suburban ghettos, with a problem of disrepair. There has been a long-term problem of gradual impoverishment of social tenants There, deprived strata of the population, mostly of immigrant origin and suffering massive under-employment, might in the past have been left to simmer away from the more affluent urban centres, sometimes becoming rife with social tensions and violence. This affects a minority of social housing but has a high profile and still produces serious tension.

Tackling this problem at its roots is all but simple, and social mix policies can break up populations seen as difficult by redevelopment. This has not had the hoped for results. It has also been sought to resolve the problem of access to the system by disadvantaged people by a new system where certain groups can apply to court to be housed if refused, the "right to housing".  This tends to intensify the controversy over social housing allocation, who should be housed. The French tradition of 'universal' social housing allocation – housing for everyone is called into question by EU competition law restricting subsidy except for the disadvantaged. In any event, the system is certainly effective in producing construction, although not with the excesses seen in the recent credit crunch elsewhere.

Germany 

Between 1925 and 1930 Germany was the site of innovative and extensive municipal public housing projects, mostly in Berlin, Hamburg, Cologne and Frankfurt.  These housing estates, were made necessary by the dreadful living conditions of pre-war urban tenements.  The right to healthy housing was written into the 1919 Weimar Constitution, but few homes were built until the economy stabilised in 1925.

The new German housing estates were low-rise, no more than five stories, and in suburban settings.  Residents were provided access to light, air, and sun.  The size, shape, orientation and architectural style of Germany's public housing were informed by the recent experience of the Viennese, the Dutch, the anti-urban Garden City Movement in Britain, the new industrialized mass-production and pre-fabrication building techniques, the novel use of steel and glass, and by the progressive-liberal policies of the Social Democrats.

Working on a tight budget inspired money and space saving innovations, such as using balcony walkways for access to the apartments rather than having internal corridors and clever use of the internal space in the  apartments.

Architects ,  and others built the Berlin Modernism Housing Estates, now a World Heritage Site, consisting of thousands of homes built in and around Berlin, including the Horseshoe Estate (named for its shape), and Uncle Tom's Cabin estate (named after a local restaurant). In Frankfurt the architect  lead the New Frankfurt public housing project, in which over 12,000 apartments were built 1925–1930. May ran his own sizable research facility to investigate, for instance, air-flow in various floorplan configurations, construction techniques, etc.

Beyond technical research May also published two magazines and embarked on a significant public-relations project, with films and classes and public exhibitions, to make  acceptable to the public. One indirect result of this publicity was the American housing movement: a young Catherine Bauer attended one of May's conferences in 1930, and wrote her influential book Modern Housing (1934) based on research done in Frankfurt and with Dutch architect .

Increasing pressure from the rising Nazis brought this era to an end in 1933.  A majority of the German public housing experts had social democrat or communist sympathies and were forced out of the country.

In East Germany, the communist administration built monolithic  apartment blocks and estates. Most new residential buildings from the 1960s onward were built in this style, as it was a quick and relatively cheap way to solve the country's severe housing shortage, which had been caused by wartime bombing raids and the large influx of German refugees from further east.

Hungary 

 is the name of a type of block of flats (panel buildings) in Hungary. It was the main housing type built in the Socialist era. From 1959 to 1990 788,000 panel flats were built in Hungary. About 2 million people, about one fifth of the country's total population, live in these flats. The Hungarian government and local municipalities began a renovation program during the 2000s. In the program they have insulated these buildings, replaced the old doors and windows with multi-layer thermo glass, renewed the heating system and colored the buildings in a more pleasant way.

Ireland 
In Ireland, public housing and halting sites (sites used by semi-nomadic Traveller communities) have been built by local authorities and are known as Local Authority Accommodation. Dublin Corporation and the former Dublin County Council provided the lion's share of Irish local authority housing, with County Longford having the largest ratio of local authority to private housing in the state.

Large-scale social housing was erected in the 1930s and 1960s, with both cases following slum clearance. Critics argue that the National Building Agency focused too much on housing delivery, and failed to deliver retail and other services.

The government has promoted tenant purchase on favourable terms, and many former social housing areas are now completely or almost completely privately owned. Housing associations, or independent, nonprofit charities, now play a significant role in rental social housing provision. As the Irish state's ability to borrow is diminished government policy favours an increased role for private financing of housing associations instead of capital grants for local authorities. Ireland currently faces a severe shortage of social and council housing, and is experiencing a housing and homelessness crisis.

Netherlands 

In the Netherlands, the rent for the cheaper rental homes is kept low through governmental oversight and regulation.

In practice this is accomplished by non-profit private housing foundations or associations. Due to frequent mergers the number of these organizations dropped to around 430 by 2009. They manage 2.4 million dwellings. The majority of the low-rent apartments in the Netherlands are owned by such organisations. Since the policy changed in 1995 the social housing organizations have become financially independent, focusing on their role as social entrepreneurs. In most Dutch municipalities there came to exist a certain minimum capacity of social housing throughout the last decades. In many cities such as Amsterdam, The Hague, Rotterdam and Utrecht the percentage of social housing approaches or even passes 50 percent. The public (financial) supervision is done by the central fund for housing.

The Dutch housing policy is based on a concept of universal access to affordable housing for all and the prevention of segregation. As of 2020, the Dutch government is attempting to build 10,000 housing units for the homeless, by 2022. There is a Homeownership Guarantee Fund to support the National Mortgage Guarantee, which provides access to finance and purchase owner-occupied housing.

Romania 

The skyline of many Romanian cities became dominated by standardized apartment blocks under the former communist government's policy of tower bloc construction. Beginning in 1974, systematization consisted largely of the demolition and reconstruction of existing villages, towns, and cities, in whole or in part, with the stated goal of turning Romania into a "multilaterally developed socialist society". In 2012, 2.7 million flats date from the communist period, accounting for 37% of total housing in Romania and for about 70% in cities and towns. Subsequent to post-communist privatization, the homeownership rate in this form of housing reached of 99.9%. The new Home Owner Associations (HOAs) were challenged internally by the cumulative effect of defaulting contributions, lack of affordability and the established practice of casual resident service in HOAs, which often triggered mismanagement. On the other hand, HOAs were challenged from outside by non-effective mechanisms to address their internal problems, such as non-existent fast court procedures against defaulting, poor financial assistance to socially disadvantaged households and a private sector unprepared to take on condominium management.

Spain 

Spaniards' reluctance to home rental, and government spending cuts in the 1980s, reduced rented public housing in Spain to a minimum. Rented public houses were relatively common in the Franco era (1939–75). With the advent of democracy and the 1978 Constitution, the right to housing became guaranteed, and the management of social housing depended mostly on the autonomous regions. This resulted in a wide variety of laws, which make the issue highly dependent on the region.

Publicly developed housing is made almost exclusively for owner-occupation, not rent, and made up 11% of the housing stock in 2010.

A new plan was put forward by the  government, aiming to make near a million homes available for public housing, relying both on new construction and refurbishment of unused houses.
	
Major parts of Spanish cities have been expanded  in the last 20 years with projects heavily dependent on public and collective housing projects, which has stressed its importance inside the main architecture schools, that have answered the challenge with the development of several specialized courses and formation plans, such as the Madrid UPM – ETH Zurich combined MCH Master in Collective Housing.

Sweden 

Swedish public housing is called , and consists mostly of flats owned by the local council. Unlike its counterparts in Great Britain, for instance, the Swedish Public Housing has never had any income restrictions. Although not carrying out housebuilding nor acquisition projects in recent times, the policies lead to a ubiquitous presence of publicly owned buildings throughout the cities of Sweden, including attractive urban areas, with a rather wide range of income among the tenants.

Policies carried out in the Swedish cities throughout the first decade of the 21st century have led to the tenants of public housing having bought the publicly owned buildings in which they live, which in turn has led to a significant decrease of publicly owned buildings in attractive urban areas.

Slovakia and Czechia 

Forms of housing projects may vary in Slovakia. In the former Czechoslovakia (now Czech Republic and Slovakia) during the communist era, a construction of large housing estates was an important part of building plans in the former Czechoslovakia. The government wanted to provide large quantities of fast and affordable housing and to slash costs by employing uniform designs over the whole country. They also sought to foster a "collectivist nature" in people. People living in these housing projects can either usually own their apartments or rent them, usually through a private landlord. There's usually a mix of social classes in these housing projects.

United Kingdom 

In the United Kingdom public housing is often referred to by the British public as "council housing" and "council estates", based on the historical role of district and borough councils in running public housing. Mass council house building began in about 1920 in order to replace older and dilapidated properties. This followed the 1919 'Addison' Act and the provison of central state subsidies; some local authority or municipal housing was provided before 1914.

Housing was a major policy area under Wilson's Labour government, 1964 to 1970, with an accelerated pace of new building, as there was still a great deal of unfit housing needing replacement. Tower blocks, first built in the 1950s, featured prominently in this era. The proportion of council housing rose from 42% to 50% of the nation's housing total, while the number of council homes built increased steadily, from 119,000 in 1964 to 133,000 in 1965 and to 142,000 in 1966.

Allowing for demolitions, 1.3 million new homes were built between 1965 and 1970. To encourage home ownership, the government introduced the Option Mortgage Scheme (1968), which made low-income house buyers eligible for subsidies (equivalent to tax relief on mortgage interest payments). This scheme had the effect of reducing housing costs for buyers on low incomes.

Since the 1970s, non-profit housing associations have been operating an increasing share of social housing properties in the United Kingdom.  From 1996 they have also been known as Registered Social Landlords (RSLs), and public housing has been referred to as "social housing" to encompass both councils and RSLs.  Despite being non-profit based, RSLs generally charge higher rents than councils.  However, the Westminster Government introduced a "rent re-structuring" policy for housing associations in England in 2002, which aimed to bring council and RSL rents into line in England by 2012. Local planning departments may require private-sector developers to offer "affordable housing" as a condition of planning permission (section 106 agreement).  This accounts for another £700m of Government funding each year for tenants in part of the United Kingdom. As of 2012, Housing Associations are now also referred to as "Private Registered Providers of Social Housing" (PRPs).

Local authorities have been discouraged from building council housing since 1979 following the election of Conservative leader Margaret Thatcher as prime minister.  The Parker Morris standard was abolished for those that were built, resulting in smaller room sizes and fewer facilities. The Right to Buy was introduced, resulting in the move of some of the best stock from public tenanted to private owner occupation.

Since the year 2000, "choice-based lettings" (CBL) have been introduced to help ensure social housing was occupied speedily as tenants moved. This can still favour the local over the non-local prospective tenant.  In a number of local authority areas, due to the shortage of council housing, three out of four properties may be designated for priority cases (those living in poor overcrowded conditions, with medical or welfare needs, or needing family support) or homeless applicants in order to meet the councils' legal obligations to rehouse people in need.  The percentage of properties set aside for vulnerable groups will vary dependent on the demand for council housing in the area.  All local authorities have a Housing Strategy to ensure that council houses are let fairly and fulfil the council's legal obligations; deal with people in need; and contribute to sustainability of housing estates, neighbourhood regeneration, and social inclusion.

The 1997–2010 Labour Government wished to move council housing away from local authority management.  At first, this was through Large Scale Voluntary Transfers (LSVT) of stock from councils to Housing Associations (HAs).  Not all council property could be transferred, as in some local authorities, their housing stock was in poor condition and had a capital value less than the remaining debts from construction costs—in effect, the council stock was in negative equity. In some local authority areas, the tenants rejected the transfer option.

The Labour Government introduced a "third way": the Arms Length Management Organisation (ALMO), where the housing stock stays with the Local Authority but is managed by a not-for-profit organisation at arm's length from the Local Authority.  It also introduced the Decent Homes programme, a capital fund to bring social housing up to a modern physical standard.  To use this fund, the manager, whether ALMO or HA, had to achieve a 2 or 3 star rating from its inspection by the Audit Commission. This was intended to drive up management standards.  Council landlords cannot access this funding, another incentive to transfer management of council housing to an ALMO or HA.

Governments since the early 1990s have also encouraged "mixed tenure" in regeneration areas and on "new-build" housing estates, offering a range of ownership and rental options, with a view to engineering social harmony through including "social housing" and "affordable housing" options. A recent research report has argued that the evidence base for tenure mixing remains thin. Social housing occupants may be stigmatised and forced to use a poor door that is separate and less convenient than the door the unsubsidised occupants use and social housing may be less desirably situated.

After the adoption of austerity policies in 2010 the traditional "safety net" model was maintained by the devolved administrations like the Scottish Parliament and the Welsh and Northern Ireland Assemblies.
  
Most UK social housing tenants have the right to swap homes with another tenant even if their landlords are different. This is called a "mutual exchange". As of 2017, in England, local authorities can destinate homeless households in local tenancies, whereas in Scotland social housing remained the first chosen policy. According to the Museum of Homelessness, in 2020 the UK recorded at least 976 deaths among homeless people. In 2019 England and Wales estimated 778 deaths with an increase of 7.2% on the previous year.

Former Soviet Union 

In the Soviet Union, most of the houses built after World War II were usually 3–5 stories high, with small apartments. In these boroughs, the goal was saving space and creating as many apartments as possible. Construction starting in the 1970s favored 9- and 16-story concrete panel municipal housing in major cities, 7–12 stories in smaller urban areas. These housing projects are still used in some countries, especially in countries in central and eastern Europe, and most of them are slowly being renovated.

Oceania

Australia 

Public housing in Australia is provided by departments of state governments, with funding provided by both the state and federal government. There are over 300,000 public housing dwellings in Australia, consisting of low-density housing on master-planned estates located in suburban areas, and also inner-city high-rise apartments in Melbourne and Sydney.

In recent decades, rooming and relief housing for the homeless has been privatised, and in recent years this housing has been sold off to avoid maintenance costs and capitalise on sales in a booming property market. In Melbourne, public housing stocks have been in decline for some time, sparking the recent Bendigo street housing campaign in which homeless people are being housed by the community campaign in homes left empty by the state government.

New Zealand 

Private companies (such as the New Zealand Company) which fostered early organised European settlement in New Zealand constructed immigration barracks to serve as temporary accommodation for their new arrivals.

The Workers' Dwellings Act of 1905 resulted in the Government of New Zealand commissioning the building of 646 houses.

In 1937 the First Labour Government launched a major public-housing system—it became known as "state housing"—for citizens unable to afford private rents. Most state housing built between 1937 and the mid-1950s consisted of detached two-to-three-bedroom cottage-style houses; only 1.5% of state houses in 1949 formed part of apartment blocks, all of them in Auckland or in greater Wellington. After World War II ended in 1945, most local authorities also started providing social housing, mainly for elderly people with low incomes.

See also 

 Fuggerei – The world's oldest social housing complex still in use
 Right to housing
 Housing estate
 Affordable housing
 Subsidized housing
 Subsidized housing in the United States
 Section 8
 Panelák and Sídlisko (Czech Republic and Slovakia)
 Social welfare
 Welfare state
Tavros

References

External links 
 

 
House types
Social programs
Urban renewal
Government aid programs